Zhang Hai Yuan (born June 12, 1977) is a Chinese track and field athlete.

Zhang represented the People's Republic of China at the 2004 Summer Paralympics in Athens, where she won gold in the long jump (F42 disability category), setting a new world record with a jump of 3.67 metres.

In 2006, Zhang competed at the FESPIC Games in Kuala Lumpur, and won set a world record in the pole vault, winning gold.

She also competes in high jump and javelin events.

References

External links
 

Athletes (track and field) at the 2004 Summer Paralympics
Paralympic athletes of China
Paralympic gold medalists for China
1977 births
Living people
Chinese female long jumpers
Medalists at the 2004 Summer Paralympics
Paralympic medalists in athletics (track and field)
FESPIC Games competitors
21st-century Chinese women